For Sale may refer to:

Film
 For Sale (1924 film), a 1924 silent film starring Vera Reynolds
 For Sale (1998 film), a 1998 French drama film

Music
 For Sale (Fool's Garden album), 2000
 For Sale (Right Said Fred album), 2006
 For Sale (Włochaty album), 1991
 For Sale... (EP), an EP by Say Anything
 For Sale? (Interlude), on To Pimp a Butterfly by Kendrick Lamar, 2015

See also
 For sale by owner
 Sale (disambiguation)